The United States District Court for the Middle District of Alabama (in case citations, M.D. Ala.) is a federal court in the Eleventh Circuit (except for patent claims and claims against the U.S. government under the Tucker Act, which are appealed to the Federal Circuit).

The District was established on February 6, 1839.

The United States Attorney's Office for the Middle District of Alabama represents the United States in civil and criminal litigation in the court.  the United States Attorney is Sandra Stewart.

Organization of the court 
The United States District Court for the Middle District of Alabama is one of three federal judicial districts in Alabama. Court for the District is held at Dothan, Montgomery, and Opelika.

Eastern Division comprises the following counties: Chambers, Lee, Macon, Randolph, Russell, and Tallapoosa.

Northern Division comprises the following counties: Autauga, Barbour, Bullock, Butler, Chilton, Coosa, Covington, Crenshaw, Elmore, Lowndes, Montgomery, and Pike.

Southern Division comprises the following counties: Coffee, Dale, Geneva, Henry, and Houston.

Current judges 

:

Vacancies and pending nominations

Former judges

Chief judges

Succession of seats

Court decisions 
Browder v. Gayle (1956) – Court rules that bus segregation in Montgomery was unconstitutional under the Fourteenth Amendment.  Decision upheld by U.S. Supreme Court six months later.

Gomillion v. Lightfoot (1958) – Court dismissed action, which was later affirmed by the Fifth Circuit.  In 1960, the U.S. Supreme Court reversed the decision, finding that electoral districts drawn in Tuskegee, with the purpose of disenfranchising black voters, violated the Fifteenth Amendment.

Lee v. Macon County Board of Education (1963) – Court rules segregation in schooling was unconstitutional under the Fourteenth and Fifteenth Amendment.  Decision upheld by U.S. Supreme Court.

United States v. Alabama (1966) – Court rules poll tax violates the Fourteenth and Fifteenth Amendment.  U.S. Supreme Court concurred three weeks later in an unrelated case, Harper v. Virginia Board of Elections.

Glassroth v. Moore (2002) – Court rules that a display of the Ten Commandments, erected by Alabama Chief Justice Roy Moore in the Alabama Judicial Building violated the Establishment Clause of the First Amendment.

U.S. Attorneys

See also 
 Courts of Alabama
 List of current United States district judges
 List of United States federal courthouses in Alabama

References

External links 
 United States District Court for the Middle District of Alabama
 United States Attorney for the Middle District of Alabama
 Restoring checks and balances in the confirmation process of United States attorneys: hearing before the Subcommittee on Commercial and Administrative Law of the Committee on the Judiciary, House of Representatives, One Hundred Tenth Congress, first session, on H.R. 580, March 6, 2007 (includes list of past U.S. attorneys up to about 1996) 

Alabama, Middle District
Alabama law
Dothan, Alabama
Montgomery, Alabama
1839 establishments in Alabama
Courts and tribunals established in 1839